The 1985 AMCU-8 men's basketball tournament was held March 6–10, 1985 at the Hammons Student Center at Southwest Missouri State University in Springfield, Missouri.

 defeated hosts  in the title game, 75–64, to win their first AMCU/Summit League championship. However, the Panthers did not earn a bid to the 1985 NCAA Division I men's basketball tournament.

Format
All eight conference members qualified for the tournament. First round seedings were based on regular season record, and the highest-seeded team in each game served as the host.

Bracket

References

Summit League men's basketball tournament
1984–85 AMCU-8 men's basketball season
1985 in sports in Missouri
Sports in Springfield, Missouri